Halolaguna discoidea is a moth in the family Lecithoceridae. It is found on Borneo.

References

Moths described in 2000
Halolaguna